Ömer Büyükaycan (born 10 May 1966 in Istanbul, Turkey) is a former Turkish professional basketball player. He is 2.08 m and played power forward  for the Turkey national basketball team over 130 times.

He also attended Loyola University Chicago.

Career

 Eczacıbaşı B.K. (1983–86)
 Galatasaray Istanbul (1986–89)
 Köln Galatasaray B.K. (1989–90)
 Çukurova Sanayi (1990–92)
 Nasaşspor (1992–93)
 Fenerbahçe (1993–94)
 Galatasaray Istanbul (1994–97)
 Darüşşafaka S.K. (1997–98)
 Beşiktaş Istanbul (1998–99)

References

External links
TBLStat.net Profile

1966 births
Living people
Basketball players from Istanbul
Centers (basketball)
Power forwards (basketball)
Turkish men's basketball players
Turkish expatriate basketball people in the United States
Turkish expatriate basketball people in Germany
Turkish expatriate basketball people
Fenerbahçe men's basketball players
Galatasaray S.K. (men's basketball) players
Beşiktaş men's basketball players
Darüşşafaka Basketbol players
Galatasaray High School alumni
Loyola Ramblers men's basketball players